SoulFest is an annual Christian music festival held in New England, United States. It currently takes place at the Gunstock Mountain Resort in Gilford, New Hampshire. Organizers have proposed moving the event to the D.L. Moody Center in Northfield, Massachusetts for 2023, pending approval from the Town of Northfield. The festival features three stages and over 80 artists and speakers. SoulFest 2022 was held from August 4-6 and SoulFest 2023 is scheduled for August 3-5.

Stages 

Soulfest has two major stages in the actual festival area. The biggest stage, the Revival Stage, hosts major name artists, such as Skillet, TobyMac, Third Day and Switchfoot, and houses well over ten thousand people on the surrounding grounds. The second biggest stage is Inside Out Stage, which has more rock-oriented artists, such as Kardia, The Chariot Collington and Flyleaf along with a number of bands geared towards worship including Jason Upton, and Gateway Worship.

Their other stages are Mercy Street and Mountain Top Stage. The Mercy Street stage is inside of a large ski lodge near the main entrance of Soulfest. Although it hosts mostly smaller acts that are lesser known, big-name acts sometimes play shows at this venue, usually late at night, at events called "Late Night Performances".

The Mountain Top stage hosts mainly acoustic acts in the festival's most scenic venue. Artists perform on the front deck of a cabin that sits on top of one of Gunstock's mountains. Guests can choose to take the chairlift to the stage or walk the beautiful hike up to the top. At this stage, you can find artists like Maeve and Matt Maher, normally with just an acoustic guitar, but occasionally a piano or a small drum set will be played. Some main stage artist will even have special acoustic and/or solo concerts at this venue.

History 
Soulfest was founded in 1998 by Dan Russell, President of NewSound Artist Management and NewSound International, who produces the annual event.  The 3 day festival began at Loon Mountain in Lincoln, New Hampshire and changed locations in 2005 to Gunstock Mountain Resort in Gilford, NH. 

At the conclusion of SoulFest 2022, organizers announced that SoulFest would relocate to the D.L. Moody Center in Northfield, Massachusetts. According to Gunstock Area Commission meeting minutes, Gunstock management sought early termination of its contract with SoulFest on the grounds that the event (which had grown to over 10,000 attendees per day, and as much as 25,000 per year) was not profitable for the resort and required significant resources, maxing out parking and campsite capacity in 2022. Festival founder Dan Russell stated "they just didn't want us back." Organizers moved ahead with advertising and selling tickets for Northfield SoulFest (proposed August 3-5, 2023), although the event had not received event permit approval from the Town of Northfield Selectboard as late as December 2022.   In discussions with the Town of Northfield, the Moody Center proposed an event attendance of 8,500 for the first Northfield SoulFest. Local residents have raised concerns that the Town of Northfield (pop. 2866 in 2020), the Moody Center itself (a former preparatory school), and the local area all lack the infrastructure to host a large regional event.

References

External links

Soulfest on YouTube

Christian music festivals